Bunclody, formerly Newtownbarry (until 1950), is a small town on the River Slaney in Wexford, Ireland.  It is located near the foot of Mount Leinster. Most of the town is in County Wexford; a small area at the north end of town is in County Carlow. Bunclody has received a number of high scores in the Tidy Towns competition. The town is known for the "Streams of Bunclody Festival" held during the month of July.

The R746 regional road intersects the N80 in the middle of Bunclody.

Name
During the 17th century, the name of the town was changed from Bunclody to Newtownbarry, but was reverted to its original name in the 20th century, following Irish independence. The change was made official by a local government order in 1950.

History 

Although a hamlet already existed here, Bunclody was raised to the status of a post town in 1577 by alderman James Barry, sheriff of Dublin.

The town was the scene of the Battle of Bunclody during the 1798 rebellion.

In the 19th century, a small canal was made, drawing water from the Clody river, to provide drinking water for the town. The canal still flows along the middle of the town's main street.
During the Tithe War, 1830–1836, 'Newtownbarry' was the scene of a clash between locals and the officials of the Crown. Locals had become enraged by the seizure of property by the police and army to pay for the Protestant Episcopal polity. According to James Connolly, "twelve peasants were shot and twenty fatally wounded".

In 1884, a metal bridge was built across the River Slaney upstream from today's bridge. It was built of iron from New Ross, and assembled in the bridge meadow beside where the bridge stood. This bridge was washed away in 1965 by a flood. The remains of the bridge were visible from the bank of the river for some years, until it was removed in 2007, during the building of Bunclody Golf and Fishing Club beside the River Slaney.

Among the amenities of the town there are number of GAA and soccer pitches, an outdoor swimming pool (open 2½ months of the year), an aparta-hotel, and two primary and two post-primary schools and an Adult Education & Training Centre.

Notable residents included the travel writer Mabel Hall-Dare (1847-1929), who grew up in the town before her marriage, in 1877, to the explorer J. Theodore Bent (1852-1897). At nearby Ballyrankin House lived the mother and daughter writers Moira O'Neill (1864–1955) and Molly Keane (1904–1996).

Civil War events 
The town was a site of three fatalities during the Irish Civil War.

The first was James Roche, a member of the Anti-Treaty IRA, who died in a car crash on 4 July 1922.

The second person killed was Lieutenant Ignatius "Nacey" Redmond, a local member of Sinn Féin, who held the post of secretary. He had overseen pro-treaty meetings in Easter 1922 in the town, in opposition to the position of his comrades, and resigned his post in Sinn Féin in August 1922 before joining the pro-treaty Free State army. On 2 October 1922, he was killed approximately two and a half miles from Bunclody on the old Bunclody-Kiltealy road.

The third was 29 year old Thomas Doyle, a World War I veteran from Enniscorthy, who later worked as a clerical officer with the Free State army. He was shot dead at Ryland's Cross outside the town when a Free State army vehicle was ambushed on 1 December 1922.

Demography
Bunclody-Carrickduff is a census town split between County Carlow and County Wexford. It comprises the town of Bunclody and the adjoining village of Carrigduff, and had a population of 1,984 at the 2016 census. An increase from 1,863 as of the 2006 census.

Demographically, a number of nationalities are represented, with approximately 13% of its population being Polish, and approximately 11% Irish Traveller.

Schools

The town has two primary schools: Bunclody National School and Carrigduff National School.  There are two secondary schools. The FCJ Secondary School and Bunclody Vocational College. The FCJ (Faithful Companions of Jesus) school was founded by a French order of nuns in 1861, and was a boarding school for girls throughout the 20th century. The all-girls school provided education for day pupils and accepted male day pupils from the late 1960s when the school became co-educational.  The old boarding school was demolished in 2002.

Tourism and culture 
Bunclody featured in the 2018 Venice Architectural Biennale, alongside 9 other Irish market towns. A volunteer led tourist office is open in the town.

There is an "Urban Adventure Hub" (managed by WWETB Slielbaggan Outdoor Activity Centre) at Ryland Road which allows access to water sports on the River Slaney. There are also a number of walking trails along the Clodey Valley and off-road trails at Coolmeelagh and Kilbranish. It is also a point on the Columban Way, which runs from Bangor, County Down through Bunclody and on through mainland Europe to Bobio in Italy – following the life journey of Saint Columbanus.

A folk song about Bunclody, titled Streams of Bunclody and written by a local emigrant, was reputedly one of Luke Kelly's "favourite ballads".

Transport 
The town is approximately 25 km from the M9 motorway and 20 km from the M11. Bunclody is served by Local Link bus routes 368 (Bunclody to Enniscorthy) and 369 (New Ross to Tullow via Bunclody).
Wexford Bus also provides a scheduled service from Wexford to Carlow via Bunclody on route 376. 'Ring a Link' buses also serve Bunclody linking it to Carlow. On Thursdays Bunclody is served by Bus Éireann's cross-country service from Rosslare Europort to Dublin via Carnew.

While Bunclody was never served by rail, early 19th century proposals called for two railway lines to serve the area; These plans never progressed. The nearest station is Enniscorthy railway station approximately 23 kilometres away.

Sport 
Bunclody Golf and Fishing Club was officially opened in early 2009. The course is on the Carlow side of the town. The 18 hole course is set on  beside the river Slaney, and is home to Ireland's first on-course elevator, which links the 17th green to the 18th tee. The great spotted woodpecker, Ireland's newest breeding bird, was spotted there in 2013. Bunclody Golf and Fishing Club hosted the Irish PGA in August 2019.

References

External links 

 Local website (bunclody.net)

Towns and villages in County Wexford